Grace Julia Parker Drummond (December 17, 1860 — June 10, 1942) was a Canadian clubwoman and philanthropist, decorated for her work during World War I.

Early life
Grace Julia Parker was born in Montreal, Quebec, the daughter of Alexander Davidson Parker and Grace Gibson Parker. Both of her parents were born in Scotland. (Because she and her mother shared a first name, she was called Julia or Grace Julia.)

Career
Julia Parker Drummond was the first president of Montreal's branch of the Canadian Council of Women (1893-1899), and helped to found the Montreal branch of the Victorian Order of Nurses in 1899. She was president of the city's Charity Organization Society from 1911 to 1919. She was director of the Woman's Historical Society, and she served as an advisor to the Parks and Playgrounds Association of Montreal. She "lent her aid ungrudgingly to every movement for the betterment of her sex," including women's suffrage.

During World War I, Drummond was in London as head of the Canadian Red Cross Information Bureau, providing news for families of missing and wounded soldiers, and to organize housing and other supports for Canadian men in hospital or on leave in London. She was decorated by the French government, the Serbian Red Cross, and the British Red Cross for her work. She also received an honorary degree from McGill University, in recognition of her community service in Montreal. In 1923, the Winnipeg Tribune named her one of the "12 Greatest Canadian Women" for her Red Cross work.

The Drummonds hosted many prominent visitors in their Montreal home, including opera singer Emma Albani and Lord and Lady Minto.

Personal life
Julia Parker married twice, first in London to the Rev. George Hamilton in 1879; she was widowed at age 19, when Hamilton died in 1880. She married as her second husband Sir George Alexander Drummond, a Canadian senator. In addition to George Drummond's seven children from his first marriage, he and Grace had two sons together; Julian Drummond died young, and Guy Drummond died at Ypres in 1915, during World War I. Grace Julia Parker Drummond was widowed for the second time in 1910, and died in 1942, aged 82 years. The Drummond Family Papers are archived at McCord Museum.

References

External links
 
 An oil painting created in about 1897, "Mrs. George A. Drummond, Lady Drummond" by Robert Harris, in the collection of the McCord Museum.

1860 births
1942 deaths
Canadian women in World War I
Canadian philanthropists
Clubwomen
20th-century Canadian women